Admiral Sir (John) Rae McKaig  (24 April 1922 – 7 January 1996) was a Royal Navy officer who became Flag Officer, Plymouth.

Naval career
Educated at Loretto School, McKaig joined the Royal Navy in 1939 and served in World War II. McKaig was made Deputy Chief of the Polaris Executive when it was established in 1963 and Commanding Officer of HM Signal School in 1966. He was appointed Assistant Chief of the Naval Staff (Operational Requirements) in 1968, Flag Officer, Plymouth and Admiral Superintendent at Devonport in 1970 and UK Military Representative to NATO in 1973 before retiring in 1976.

In retirement he became a Director at Inchcape plc. He lived at Hambledon in Hampshire.

Family
In 1945 he married Barbara Dawn Marriott; they had two sons and one daughter.

References

|-

1922 births
1996 deaths
Royal Navy admirals
Knights Commander of the Order of the Bath
Commanders of the Order of the British Empire
People educated at Loretto School, Musselburgh
Royal Navy officers of World War II